Cheshmeh Pahn-e Alishah (also Romanized as Cheshmeh Pahn-e ʿAlīshāh) is a village in Cheleh Rural District, in the Central District of Gilan-e Gharb County, Kermanshah Province, Iran. At the 2006 census, its population was 198, in 53 families.

References 

Populated places in Gilan-e Gharb County